The men's freestyle 74 kilograms at the 2004 Summer Olympics as part of the wrestling program were held at the Ano Liosia Olympic Hall, August 28 to August 29.

The competition held with an elimination system of three or four wrestlers in each pool, with the winners qualify for the quarterfinals, semifinals and final by way of direct elimination.

Schedule
All times are Eastern European Summer Time (UTC+03:00)

Results 
Legend
WO — Won by walkover

Elimination pools

Pool 1

Pool 2

Pool 3

Pool 4

Pool 5

Pool 6

Pool 7

Knockout round

Final standing

 Murad Gaidarov was ejected from the competition after he ran off the mat at the conclusion of his quarterfinal bout and assaulted his opponent, Buvaisar Saitiev, before being restrained by security and police.

References

Official Report

Men's Freestyle 74 kg
Men's events at the 2004 Summer Olympics